This is a list of cities and towns in the Federated States of Micronesia. They are sorted here by state, and alphabetically

Chuuk (Truk) Islands 
Cities and towns in Chuuk, also known as Truk, are as follows:
 Fefan
 Lekinioch
 Lugav
 Nepononong
 Niewe
 Nukaf
 Nukan
 Ounoun Municipality
 Polle Island
 Roro
 Ruo
 Sapou
 Tol Island
 Udot
 Weno

Kosrae 
Cities and Towns in Kosrae, also known as Kosaie, are as follows:
 Lelu
 Malem
 Okat
 Tafunsak
 Tofol
 Utwa Ma
 Walung
 Yeseng

Pohnpei 
Cities and towns in Pohnpei, also known as Ponape,  are as follows:
 Alohkapw
 Danipei
 Dauahk Islands
 Dehpehk Island
 Enipein
 Kipar
 Lot
 Madolenihmw
 Meilap
 Mokil
 Mwahd
 Mwalok
 Palikir
 Parem Island
 Peidi
 Peidi Island
 Pingelap
 Pwel Weita
 Rehntu
 Rohi
 Takaieu Island
 Tamworohi
 Wone

Yap 
Cities and towns in Yap are as follows:
 Baleabat'
 Bechyal
 Bugol
 Colonia
 Dinaey
 Gagil-Tomil
 Gaqnaqun
 Kanif
 Maap
 Maaq
 Magachgil
 Mal'Aay
 Ngariy
 Ngoof
 Rumung
 Ruun'Uw
 Wanead
 Wanyaan

References 

Micronesia